Shatin Anglican Church is a Hong Kong Sheng Kung Hui (Anglican) church located in Shatin, New Territories, Hong Kong. It is a mission church under the Diocese of Eastern Kowloon. It was established in 1991 as a daughter church of St. Andrew's Church.

The current minister is Rev. Heewoo Han.

External links
 

Sha Tin
Anglican Diocese of Eastern Kowloon
Anglican church buildings in Hong Kong